James Staniforth Ricketson is an Australian film director, known for the feature film Blackfellas. He became more widely known when he was charged with espionage for flying a drone in Cambodia in 2017.

Film career
Ricketson studied at the Australian Film and Television School and has made a number of features and documentaries.

In 1973 Ricketson filmed and helped to organise Philippe Petit's high-wire walk between the two north pylons of Sydney Harbour Bridge. A short film of the walk was released on DVD with Man On Wire, the Academy Award-winning documentary on Petit's World Trade Center Twin Towers walk.

Ricketson directed the feature films Third Person Plural (1978), Candy Regentag (1989), Blackfellas (1994). His documentaries include Reflections (1973), Roslyn and Blagica Everyone Needs a Friend (1979), Born in Soweto (1994), Sleeping with Cambodia (1997), Backpacking Australia (2001), and Viva (2004).

In 1981 he became one of the founding members of the Australian Directors Guild. In the same year he directed one of the four episodes of the award-winning Australian miniseries Women of the Sun. In July 2012 it was announced he was suing Screen Australia.

Trouble in Cambodia
In 2014 Ricketson was fined six-million Cambodian riel (A$1,500) and given a suspended two-year prison sentence by a Phnom Penh court for threatening to broadcast accusations that a local branch of the Brisbane-based Citipointe Church sold children.

In June 2017, he was arrested while flying a drone at a Cambodia National Rescue Party rally in Phnom Penh, Cambodia, and charged with espionage, a charge he denies. He was held in Prey Sar prison and his trial began in a Phnom Penh court on 16 August 2018, with character testimony from Australian film director Peter Weir. On 31 August he was found guilty and sentenced to six years in prison. It was announced on 21 September 2018 that Cambodian authorities had pardoned Ricketson for the offence.

Selected filmography
Third Person Plural (1978)
Candy Regentag (1989)
Blackfellas (1994)

Awards
 AACTA Award for Best Adapted Screenplay, Blackfellas (1994)
 AACTA Award for Best Film, Reflections (1973) 
 Alan Stout Award for Best Short Film, Reflections (1973)

Personal life
Ricketson is the grandson of stockbroker Staniforth Ricketson. He has a son, Jesse, and is a surrogate father to Roxanne Holmes, whom he met "while researching a film project about street kids" in the 1980s.

References

External links

Australian film directors
Living people
1949 births
Prisoners and detainees of Cambodia
Australian people imprisoned abroad
Australian prisoners and detainees
2018 in Cambodia
21st-century Australian criminals